Gerinu or Gerinow may refer to:
Garinuiyeh
Gerinuiyeh